Musaabad-e Kashani (also Romanized as Mūsáābād-e Kāshānī; also known as Mūsáābād) is a village in Behnamvasat-e Shomali Rural District, in the Central District of Varamin County, Tehran Province, Iran. At the 2006 census, its population was 405, with 92 families living in the village.

References 

Populated places in Varamin County